Maher Guizani is a Tunisian football manager.

References

Year of birth missing (living people)
Living people
Tunisian football managers
AS Djerba managers
Jendouba Sport managers
CS Hammam-Lif managers
Olympique Béja managers
AS Marsa managers
ES Métlaoui managers